Francisco Vieira (13 May 1765 – 2 May 1805), who choose the artistic name of Vieira Portuense, was a Portuguese painter, one of the introducers of Neoclassicism in Portuguese painting. He was, in the neoclassical style, one of the two great Portuguese painters of his generation, with Domingos Sequeira.

Career
He first studied in Lisbon, later moving to Rome. He travelled through Italy, Germany, Austria and England, before returning to Portugal, in 1800. He met Swiss painter Angelica Kauffman, from whom he seems to have received influences.
He seems to anticipate some motives of the romantic painting in several of his historical paintings, like "Dona Filipa de Vilhena knighting her sons" (1801).

He contracted tuberculosis, and moved to Madeira, where he died, aged only 39.

He is represented at the National Museum of Ancient Art, in Lisbon, and at the National Museum Soares dos Reis, in Porto.

Not to be confused with another Portuguese painter, Francisco Vieira de Matos, better known as Vieira Lusitano.

Works

References
José-Augusto França, A Arte em Portugal no Século XIX, Lisboa, Bertrand Editora, 1991, volume 1.

External links

1765 births
1805 deaths
Portuguese neoclassical painters
18th-century Portuguese painters
18th-century male artists
Portuguese male painters
19th-century Portuguese painters
19th-century male artists
Artists from Porto